Ragnvald Moe (1873–1965) was a Norwegian historian.

He was born in Bergen, and took the cand.philol. degree in 1900. He worked as amanuensis at the University Library of Oslo from 1904 to 1909, then as a secretary of the Norwegian Nobel Committee from 1909, and was director of the Norwegian Nobel Institute from 1928 to 1946.

References

20th-century Norwegian historians
1873 births
1965 deaths
Writers from Bergen
Amanuenses